Nogometni klub Svoboda Ljubljana, commonly referred to as NK Svoboda Ljubljana or simply Svoboda, is a Slovenian football club from Ljubljana which plays in the Slovenian Third League.

History

The club was formed as ŠD Svoboda in 1952 and was known as one of the best Slovenian clubs during the time of SFR Yugoslavia.  It started in lower rangs, but then merged with Grafičar, took its place in Slovenian League and played under that name until 1962. The most successful years came in the seventies, when the club was playing in Yugoslav Second Division under the sponsorship of Mercator, national food market company. In 1971 they have won the Slovenian Republic League for the first time and earned a promotion to the Yugoslav Second Division West, where they played until 1982, with the exception of three triumphal republic seasons.

During this period they have also won two cup titles in 1976 and 1978. Therefore, they participated in the Yugoslav Cup in the next two seasons, in the latter they were eliminated by Borac Banja Luka in the Round of 16.
After the independence of Slovenia in 1991, Svoboda played in the Slovenian PrvaLiga for three seasons, finishing in 11th, 6th, and 13th place. In 1994 the club was replaced by Slavija with many players leaving from them to Vevče. Svoboda then played several seasons in lower divisions, before returning to the scene in 2003, when they were promoted to the Slovenian Second League. They have played there for three seasons, scoring the best result in the 2004–05 season with third place, which was not enough to secure promotion, due to Slovenian First League being decreased to ten teams. In the next two seasons Svoboda was relegated from the second and third division, having serious financial troubles. The club was taken over by NK Interblock in 2008 to become their feeder team for youth selections, but this collaboration lasted only one season. Svoboda started on their own again in 2009. In 2018, Svoboda returned to the Slovenian Third League after they won a promotion play-off against Žiri.

Managers

Honours
League
Slovenian Republic League
Winners: 1970–71, 1974–75, 1977–78, 1979–80
Slovenian Third League
Winners: 2002–03
Ljubljana Regional League (fourth tier)
Winners: 2010–11, 2017–18
Slovenian Fifth Division
Winners: 1994–95, 2009–10

Cup
Slovenian Republic Cup
Winners: 1975–76, 1977–78
MNZ Ljubljana Cup
Winners: 2003–04

Domestic league and cup results

*Best results are highlighted.

References

External links
Official website 

Association football clubs established in 1952
Football clubs in Slovenia
Football clubs in Yugoslavia
1952 establishments in Slovenia
Football clubs in Ljubljana